German occupation of Estonia may refer to:

 German occupation of Estonia during World War I
 German occupation of Estonia during World War II